Bharati is a permanent Antarctic research station commissioned by India. It is India's third Antarctic research facility and one of two active Indian research stations, alongside Maitri. India's first committed research facility, Dakshin Gangotri, is being used as a supply base. India has demarcated an area beside Larsemann Hills at 69°S, 76°E for construction. The research station has been operational since 18 March 2012, though it is still being run on trial basis and formal launch is awaited. Since its completion, India has become one of nine nations to have multiple stations within the Antarctic Circle. Bharati's research mandate focuses on oceanographic studies and the phenomenon of continental breakup. It also facilitates research to refine the current understanding of the Indian subcontinent's geological history. News sources have referred to the station as "Bharathi", "Bharti" and "Bharati".

Facilities
The station can host a total of 72 personnel, 47 in the main building all year round and an additional 25 in shelters during summer. The main station building is supported by a fuel farm and station, sea water pump and a summer camp.

High-speed satellite raw data would be beamed in real time from Bharati Station to NRSC in Hyderabad for processing the images once the project starts functioning.

In 2007, ECIL also established the communication link between Maitri, the second Indian research station in Antarctica and National Centre for Polar and Ocean Research (NCPOR). Among others, research on tectonics and geological structures would be undertaken at Bharati Station by Indian scientists.
India also became the first nation to use the shipping containers as integral part of construction and hence constructing its base in record time and money.

Discoveries and achievements
In January 2017, Felix Bast, one of the scientists on the 36th Indian expedition to the Antarctic, discovered a new moss species at Larsemann Hills, near the Bharati research station, and named it Bryum bharatiense.

See also
 Dakshin Gangotri First Indian station 1983, converted to support base
 Maitri Second Indian station 1989
 Defence Research and Development Organisation 
 Defence Institute of High Altitude Research
 Indian Antarctic Program
 Indian Astronomical Observatory
 Jantar Mantar, Jaipur
 National Centre for Polar and Ocean Research
 Siachen Base Camp (India)
 List of Antarctic field camps
 List of Antarctic research stations
 List of highest astronomical observatories

References

External links
 National Centre for Antarctic and Ocean Research

Outposts of Antarctica
Indian Antarctic Programme
Antarctic research
Research in India
2012 establishments in Antarctica